Fritz Gunter Sachs (14 November 1932 – 7 May 2011, also Gunter Sachs von Opel) was a German photographer, author, industrialist, and latterly head of an institute that researched claims of astrology. As a young man he became a sportsman, then gained international fame as a documentary film-maker, documentary photographer, and third husband of Brigitte Bardot.

Early life

Sachs was born in southern Germany. His mother was Eleanor, the daughter of Wilhelm von Opel, co-founder of the automaker Opel; his father was Willy Sachs, sole owner of Fichtel & Sachs, a leading manufacturer of ball bearings in Schweinfurt and one of Germany's biggest automobile suppliers. Willy was friendly with Hermann Göring and Heinrich Himmler and arrested by the American military after the war but finally declared a follower and released. Gunter Sachs commented on his father's past in several publications. Willy committed suicide in 1958 by shooting himself. Sachs' brother, Ernst Wilhelm, died in an avalanche in 1977.

Sachs is said to have been educated at Institut auf dem Rosenberg in St Gallen, Switzerland. He later studied maths and economics.

Personal life
A playboy in his early years, Sachs was romantically linked to the former Iranian empress Soraya Esfandiary. He married three times. His first wife,  Anne-Marie Faure, died in 1958 during surgery. He married Anne-Marie at the age of 23. He courted his second wife, Brigitte Bardot, by flying over her villa on the French Riviera in a helicopter and dropping hundreds of roses. The couple were married on 14 July 1966 in Las Vegas; they divorced in 1969. His final marriage was to Swedish former model, Mirja Larsson, (who was 26 at the time of their engagement) which lasted from 1969 until his death. He had a son Rolf Sachs (born 1955), with his first wife, and a further two sons (Christian Gunnar and Claus Alexander) with his third wife.

In addition to his German nationality, Sachs received Swiss citizenship in 1976.

Sports
From 1969 until his death, Sachs was the chairman of the St. Moritz Bobsleigh Club. Turn 13 of the St. Moritz-Celerina Olympic Bobrun is named in his honour.

Art collector
Sachs' extensive art collection included works by Jean Fautrier, Andy Warhol, René Magritte, Salvador Dalí, Roy Lichtenstein, Tom Wesselmann, Mel Ramos, and Allen Jones. He also owned important pieces from the Nouveau réalisme school including Yves Klein, Jean Tinguely, Arman, and Martial Raysse. Many of these artists were involved in the 1969 design of the legendary pop-art-apartment in the tower of the Palace Hotel in St. Moritz, which quickly gained the art world's attention. From 1967 to 1975 Sachs, together with Prince Konstantin of Bavaria, co-founded and headed the association for the Modern Art Museum in Munich (MAM), which lobbied for the construction of a comprehensive museum of contemporary art in Munich and mounted monthly exhibitions at Villa Stuck. Victor Vasarely, Georg Baselitz, Heinz Edelmann, Christo, Cy Twombly, Alexander Calder, Heinz Mack and Jean Tinguely, Roy Lichtenstein, and Gotthard Graubner found their way into the rooms of the museum.

In 1972 Sachs opened a gallery in Hamburg and organised the first European exhibition of his friend Warhol. In 1974, he commissioned Warhol with a series of silkscreen portraits of his ex-wife Brigitte Bardot. In May 2006, Sachs sold one of Warhol's silk screens of Bardot at auction for $3 million. The Sachs family sold part of his collection of Pop Art and Nouveau Realisme through Sotheby's in May 2012.

Photographer
From 1972 Sachs worked as a professional photographer. In 1973 he caused a stir with the first nude photograph for French Vogue. In 1991 he worked with Claudia Schiffer on the "Heroines" series. He gained international recognition in 1974 with a special show at the photokina trade show for which he also designed the official exhibition poster. In 1976 he was awarded the Leica Award. At the 'German photo days' and the photokina he received prizes for "Die Farbe Weiss" in 1994 and for "Die Farbe Rot" in 1995.

The focus of his photography are surreal nudes and landscapes, which were published in no less than seven image volumes. Early on, Sachs also experimented with digital photography. The proceeds from the sale of his photographs and illustrated books went into the Mirja Sachs Foundation, which helps children in need.

Astrological research
Sachs' methodology and the statistical analysis have been criticised by mathematicians. They found serious errors in all parts and deny any statistical significance after the necessary corrections in his data.

Death
Sachs died by suicide on 7 May 2011 by a gunshot wound to the head at his home in Gstaad, Switzerland. The suicide note stated that he acted because of what he defined as "hopeless illness A." (which some have speculated to be Alzheimer's) adding that "The loss of mental control over my life was an undignified condition, which I decided to counter decisively".

Literature
Sachs, Gunter: The Astrology File: Scientific Proof of the Link Between Star Signs and Human Behaviour. Orion Books (December 1999). 
Elwell, Dennis: Cosmic Loom, 2nd edition 1999. The Urania Trust. . Discussion and interpretation of some of Gunter Sachs results and related material.

References

External links
https://web.archive.org/web/20080208135701/http://www.guntersachs.ch/ 
https://web.archive.org/web/20060407202044/http://www.gunter-sachs.de/ 
http://www.astrology-and-science.com
Obituary of Gunter Sachs, The Daily Telegraph, 9 May 2011

1932 births
2011 deaths
Opel family
People from Schweinfurt (district)
German art collectors
Astrological data collectors
Photographers from Bavaria
Suicides by firearm in Switzerland
Artists who committed suicide
People from Gstaad
2011 suicides
Institut auf dem Rosenberg alumni